RANA University is a higher education University in Afghanistan.

The University provides degrees in Information Technology (BIT), Software Engineering (BSE), Law (LLB), Political Science and Business Administration.

Classes in the business and computer departments are taught in English. Classes in other areas, such as those for the Bachelor of Law (LLB) degree and BJM (Bachelor of Journalism and Mass Communication), are taught in Dari.

See also 
List of universities in Afghanistan

References

Universities and colleges in Kabul
Persian-language education
2009 establishments in Afghanistan
Educational institutions established in 2009